Caravels are an American post-hardcore band from Henderson, Nevada.

History
Caravels began in 2010 with the release of an EP titled Floorboards. In 2011, Caravels released a self-titled 7" via Topshelf Records.

In 2012, Caravels released a 12" split with Gifts from Enola titled Well Worn via Topshelf Records and The Mylene Sheath.

On March 26, 2013, Caravels released their first full-length album titled Lacuna via Topshelf Records.

In January 2015, Caravels released a split with Octaves via Topshelf Records and Bridge Nine Records before going on hiatus.

Band members
Michael Roeslein - vocals
George Foskaris - drums
Matthew Frantom - guitar 
Dillon Shines - guitar, vocals
Cory Van Cleef - bass

Discography
Studio albums
Floorboards (2011, Topshelf Records)
Lacuna (2013, Topshelf Records)
EPs
 Floorboards (2010, self-released)
Caravels (2011, Topshelf Records)
Splits
Caravels/Gifts from Enola - Well Worn (2012, Topshelf Records & The Mylene Sheath)
Caravels/Octaves (2014, Topshelf Records & Bridge Nine Records)

References

Musical groups established in 2010
Topshelf Records artists
2010 establishments in Nevada